Coolangatta Mountain is a small mountain rising from the Shoalhaven River Plain in New South Wales. It rises to about 300 metres above sea level and is not open to the public. It is covered in remnant bushland and is easily visible from Saddleback Mountain. It is named after an early settlement on the banks of the Shoalhaven known as Coolangatta and is only indirectly related to the better-known Coolangatta, Queensland.

References

External links

Mountains of New South Wales
South Coast (New South Wales)